Jens Filbrich (born 13 March 1979 in Suhl, Bezirk Suhl) is a German cross-country skier who has been competing since 1998. He won two medals in the 4 × 10 km relay at the Winter Olympics with a silver in 2006 and a bronze in 2002. Filbrich's best individual Olympic finish was 17th in the 50 km freestyle event in 2006.

Filbrich also has six medals at the FIS Nordic World Ski Championships, earning four silvers (Team sprint: 2005, 4 × 10 km: 2003, 2005, 2009) and two bronzes (4 × 10 km: 2001 50 km: 2007).

Filbrich has two skiing victories in the World and Continental Cups as of the 2005–6 season (2003, 2005).

He is the son of former cross-country skier Sigrun Krause, and former cross-country skier, coach and sports official Wolfgang Filbrich.

Cross-country skiing results
All results are sourced from the International Ski Federation (FIS).

Olympic Games
 2 medals – (1 silver, 1 bronze)

World Championships
 7 medals – (4 silver, 3 bronze)

World Cup

Season standings

Individual podiums
5 podiums

Team podiums
 8 victories – (6 , 2 ) 
 15 podiums – (13 , 2 )

References

External links
 
 
 
 
  

1979 births
Living people
People from Suhl
German male cross-country skiers
Tour de Ski skiers
Sportspeople from Thuringia
Cross-country skiers at the 2002 Winter Olympics
Cross-country skiers at the 2006 Winter Olympics
Cross-country skiers at the 2010 Winter Olympics
Cross-country skiers at the 2014 Winter Olympics
Olympic cross-country skiers of Germany
Olympic silver medalists for Germany
Olympic bronze medalists for Germany
Olympic medalists in cross-country skiing
FIS Nordic World Ski Championships medalists in cross-country skiing
Medalists at the 2006 Winter Olympics
Medalists at the 2002 Winter Olympics